The Eggebek Solar Park was Germany's largest photovoltaic power station when completed in August 2011, and one of the largest in the world. It is built on a  plot of land near the Eggebek municipality in Schleswig-Holstein state, Germany near the border with Denmark. The solar park has a power generation capacity of 83.6 MW and uses roughly 360,000 multicrystalline solar modules of the TSM-PC05 series produced by the Chinese company Trina Solar.

The solar park is built on the site of a former German Navy military base where the Naval Aviation Wing 2 was stationed until 2005.

See also

Energy policy of the European Union
Photovoltaics
Renewable energy commercialization
Renewable energy in the European Union

References

Photovoltaic power stations in Germany
2011 establishments in Germany
Defunct airports in Germany